Andrew J. Trapani is an American film and television producer. His film and TV credits include Winchester and The Haunting in Connecticut.

Career 
Trapani is a founder and producer at Nine/8 Entertainment in Los Angeles California. Prior to forming Nine/8 Entertainment, he was a founding partner at Integrated Films & Management, where he represented writers and directors. He began his entertainment career as a designer and producer of video games for Crystal Dynamics.

In 2009, he produced The Haunting in Connecticut, which opened at #2 at the box office and went on to gross over $99 million. In 2018, he produced Winchester, a supernatural horror film starring Oscar-winner Helen Mirren. In 2016, production began on a documentary about the Showtime era of the Los Angeles Lakers, which Trapani is producing in partnership with Lakers president Jeanie Buss.

His projects in development include a remake of the 1981 film An American Werewolf in London, a film adaptation of the Richard Brautigan novel The Hawkline Monster., and a scripted sports drama series for Showtime which he is co-producing with legendary basketball coach Phil Jackson.

Trapani is from Saratoga, California.

References

External links

Film producers from California
American people of Jewish descent
People from Saratoga, California
1970 births
Living people